Movie Star, American Style or; LSD, I Hate You is a 1966 American film directed by Albert Zugsmith starring Del Moore.

References

External links
Film page at TCMDB
film page at BFI

1966 films
American comedy films
1966 comedy films
1960s English-language films
Films directed by Albert Zugsmith
1960s American films